The 2008 ICC World Cricket League Africa Region Division Three was a cricket tournament in South Africa, taking place between 13 and 18 April 2008. It gave seven African Associate and Affiliate members of the International Cricket Council experience of international one-day cricket and formed part of the global World Cricket League structure.

The top two teams, Malawi and Sierra Leone was promoted to Division 2.

Teams

There were eight teams that played in the tournament, but Morocco withdrew due to visa problems and was replaced by a South African Invitation XI. These teams were non-test member nations of the African Cricket Association. The teams that played were:

Squads

Group stage

Points Table

†Tournament rules did not allow them to participate in the semifinals, and their place was taken by Eswatini (third in Pool 2).

Group stage

5th Place Playoff

Semifinals and Finals

Statistics

International cricket competitions in 2008
2008, 3
International cricket competitions in South Africa